The Litang Horse Festival is a summer horse festival held in Litang County, Sichuan province, China. Khampas from all over the Tibetan Plateau come to trade, celebrate and ride. Khampas are Tibetan nomads who are usually herders. 

The festival is normally held in the first week in August. During the festival, horsemanship displays and horse races are held using Tibetan Ponies. These small and fast horses are raced and shown to determine who owns the best horse. The horse festival is significant because it helps to establish a socio-economic hierarchy amongst the  Khampas who participate. Much honor and prestige accrues to the Khampa who owns the best horse. 

A very large tourism business has been built up on adventure trips and tours provided by companies who cater to individuals who are interested in horses and horsemanship. These companies take groups of tourists throughout the different Tibetan villages hosting horse festivals. This benefits the nomads' economy as well as that of the rest of China.

References 
Downs, James. "The Origin and Spread of Riding in the Near East and Central Asia." American Anthropologist. 1961.
Horse Racing Fair and Archery Festival in Tibet
Tours and information on races
Horse tours

External links
Video of horse race
Photos of horses and races

Tourist attractions in Sichuan
Festivals in China
Animal festival or ritual
Equestrian festivals
Summer events in China